Abner Jonathan Acuña Álvarez (born 5 March 1997) is a Nicaraguan footballer who plays as a midfielder for Liga Primera club Diriangén and the Nicaragua national team.

References

1997 births
Living people
People from Carazo Department
Nicaraguan men's footballers
Association football midfielders
Diriangén FC players
Nicaraguan Primera División players
Nicaragua international footballers